Ayni Airport, is an airport serving Ayni in the Sughd Province in Tajikistan. It does not seem to be coded in IATA or ICAO lists, but had however the code АЙН  in the former USSR internal system.

References

Airports in Tajikistan
Sughd Region